is a yaoi manga written and illustrated by Kazuhiko Mishima. The manga was released by Core Magazine on December 23, 2004 in Japan. It is licensed in English by Digital Manga Publishing, which released the manga 8 April 2008 under its Juné imprint.

Reception
Briana Lawrence enjoyed that the characters' insecurities were "normal", especially enjoying the inclusion of an overweight character as a romantic protagonist, which she regards as unusual for the yaoi genre.  Holly Ellingwood described the manga as "cute", enjoying the "gentle comedy".

References

External links

Yaoi anime and manga
Digital Manga Publishing titles